The St. Catherine Cathedral also called Cajamarca Cathedral It is the main temple of the Catholic Church in the city of Cajamarca in Peru. Built in Baroque style it is owned by the Catholic Diocese of Cajamarca, and was declared Cultural Heritage of the Nation in Peru in 1972.

In the seventeenth century the construction of the current building starts. In the eighteenth century they are melted the bells of the cathedral. Since 1908 holds the rank cathedral.

It is under the pastoral responsibility of the Bishop José Carmelo Martínez Lázaro

See also
Roman Catholicism in Peru
St. Catherine's Church (disambiguation)

References

Roman Catholic cathedrals in Peru
Cajamarca